Voyage to the Crystal Grotto is a tow boat ride that is currently operating at Shanghai Disneyland Park. The ride is the first ride to take riders inside a Disney castle and opened  along with the rest of the park on June 16, 2016.

Ride Experience
The ride is described officially as "an enchanting excursion that travels the waters of Fantasyland. Fanciful fountains and sculptures line the water’s edge, celebrating classic tales of magic and imagination. At journey’s end, guests glide beneath Enchanted Storybook Castle, into a secret, underground chamber in which fountains of light leap and dance in shimmering pools, surrounding guests with magic, music and color. The experience is sure to inspire the dreams and imaginations of all who make this wondrous voyage." 

The boat takes riders past sculpture gardens featuring characters from Disney movies such as Beauty and the Beast, Aladdin, The Sorcerer's Apprentice from Fantasia, Tangled, Mulan, and The Little Mermaid. Afterwards, the boat glides into a chamber underneath the Enchanted Storybook Castle, which has "fountains of light", music, and water effects.

References

External links
 

Shanghai Disneyland
Amusement rides introduced in 2016
Tow boat rides
Walt Disney Parks and Resorts attractions
2016 establishments in China